The women's 10 kilometre freestyle pursuit cross-country skiing competition at the 1998 Winter Olympics in Nagano, Japan, was held on 10 February at Snow Harp.

The startlist for this race was based on the 5 km classical event from earlier in the games. The winner of the 5 km classical event, Larissa Lazutina of Russia, was the first starter in the pursuit. The rest of the competitors started behind Lazutina with the same number of seconds that they were behind her at the 5 km classical event. The winner of the race was the first competitor to finish the pursuit.

Results 
The time reflects the combined time from both the 5 km classical and the 10 km freestyle pursuit.

References

Women's cross-country skiing at the 1998 Winter Olympics
Women's pursuit cross-country skiing at the Winter Olympics
Oly
Women's events at the 1998 Winter Olympics